Réaux-sur-Trèfle is a commune in the Charente-Maritime department of southwestern France. The municipality was established on 1 January 2016 and consists of the former communes of Réaux, Moings and Saint-Maurice-de-Tavernole.

See also 
Communes of the Charente-Maritime department

References 

Communes of Charente-Maritime
Populated places established in 2016